Juan Angel Calzado de Castro (born 16 March 1937) is a former field hockey player from Spain, who captured the bronze medal with the Men's National Team at the 1960 Summer Olympics in Rome, Italy. Later on, he became the president of the International Hockey Federation (FIH).

References

External links
 

1937 births
Living people
Spanish male field hockey players
Olympic field hockey players of Spain
Field hockey players at the 1960 Summer Olympics
Field hockey players at the 1964 Summer Olympics
Olympic bronze medalists for Spain
Olympic medalists in field hockey
Medalists at the 1960 Summer Olympics
20th-century Spanish people
Spanish sports executives and administrators